Glycyrrhiza uralensis, also known as Chinese liquorice, is a flowering plant native to Asia. It is used as a sweetener and in traditional Chinese medicine.

Traditional uses 

It is used in Chinese medicine to harmonize other herbs and to reduce the harsh effects of other herbs. It is usually collected in spring and autumn, when it is sliced and sun-dried, then either used unprepared or stir-baked with honey. Liquorice root is most commonly produced in the Shanxi, Gansu and Xinjiang regions of China.

Side effects
Liquorice root contains glycyrrhizin, which may affect blood pressure, blood potassium levels or have untoward effects during pregnancy. Overuse of licorice may induce weakness, headache, blurred vision, nosebleed, anxiety, or shortness of breath. Other common side effects may include missed menstrual periods, fluid retention or sexual problems in men. More serious instances of overuse can lead to hypertension and hyperaldosteronism, which may require hospitalization.

Plant description

Harvesting and growth 
Glycyrrhiza uralensis can be found growing naturally in Europe, Asia, and throughout the Middle East. This Chinese licorice is harvested mainly during the spring and autumn and is dried by sunlight. The plant is very strong rooted, and grow to be 30-120 cm tall.

Chemistry 
The plant contains a glycoside that is 30-50 times sweeter than sucrose, glycyrrhizin, which  has the chemical composition C42H62O16. The plant contains numerous phytochemicals.

See also 
 
 Liquorice

References

External links 
 Spice Pages: liquorice (Glycyrrhiza glabra/uralensis, liquorice)
 Science Direct
 Journal of Chinese Integrative Medicine
 Radix Glycyrrhizae at damo-qigong.net

Plants used in Ayurveda
Plants used in traditional Chinese medicine
uralensis